William Charles Cuff (19 August 1868 – 6 February 1949) was an English football chairman he was in charge of Everton F.C. from 1921 to 1938.

Career
William Charles Cuff was born in Liverpool, Lancashire, England, on 19 August 1868. His father, Henry Albert Cuff, was from London. His mother, Mary Thomas, was Welsh. Cuff was in charge of Everton F.C. for over 500 games between 1901 and 1918. He was Chairman of Everton from 1921 to 1938. Cuff was an active freemason attending Cecil Lodge No. 3274. As a manager of Everton FC he won the FA Cup in the 1905–06 season and the First Division league title in the 1914–15 season.

See also 
 List of English football championship-winning managers

References

External links
evertonfc.com - Official Everton FC Website
toffeeweb.com - Article covering an evening devoted to the memory of Will Cuff organised by the Everton Shareholders' Association

Everton F.C. managers
Everton F.C. players
English people of Welsh descent
English football managers
1868 births
1949 deaths
Presidents of the English Football League
Footballers from Liverpool
Freemasons of the United Grand Lodge of England
Association footballers not categorized by position
English footballers